Bogucin  is a village in the administrative district of Gmina Swarzędz, within Poznań County, Greater Poland Voivodeship, in west-central Poland. It lies just outside Poznań's city boundaries, on the main road to Gniezno.

The village has a population of 1,012.

References

Bogucin